The Harringay Racers were a motorcycle speedway team who raced at the Harringay Stadium from 1947 until 1954 in the National League Division One.

History
The Racers were the third of three speedway teams to be based at Harringay Stadium. From 1929 to 1931 the Harringay Canaries were based there and later from 1934 to 1939, the team was known as the Harringay Tigers. Racing ceased because of World War II. The stadium reopened on 4 April 1947 at which point the team were revived as the Harringay Racers.

The team finished runner-up in the league in 1948 and 1953. During the 1952 Speedway National League season the team became the National Trophy champions.

Australian Vic Duggan was the top man in the league for a few years. His brother Ray Duggan raced with him until his death in a track accident in Australia. Split Waterman, signed from Wembley, took on the mantle of top scorer. Jack Biggs had a couple of spells with Racers, sandwiching a time at Bradford. The track was used for one-off meetings in 1958, 1960 and 1961.

Although not following their father into motorbike speedway, Wally Lawrence's 3 sons all raced in Cycle Speedway with two of them becoming British champions in the veteran series in recent years.

Notable riders

Season summary

References

External links
1947 - 1953 statistics

Defunct British speedway teams
Speedway teams in London